National Route 196 is a national highway of Japan connecting Matsuyama, Ehime and Saijō, Ehime in Japan, with a total length of 66.4 km (41.26 mi).

References

National highways in Japan
Roads in Ehime Prefecture